Liu Mengtao (born 23 November 2001) is a Chinese paralympic biathlete who competed at the 2022 Winter Paralympics.

Career
He competed at the 2022 Winter Paralympics in the biathlon competition, winning the gold medal in the men's 10 kilometres sitting event and the bronze medal in the men's 6 kilometres sitting event.

References

External links 
Paralympic Games profile

Living people
Place of birth missing (living people)
2001 births
Biathletes at the 2022 Winter Paralympics
Medalists at the 2022 Winter Paralympics
Paralympic gold medalists for China
Paralympic bronze medalists for China
Paralympic medalists in biathlon
21st-century Chinese people